The Frisco Fighters are a professional indoor football team based in Frisco, Texas.  A member of the Indoor Football League, the Fighters play their home games at the Comerica Center. The team was set to participate in the 2020 season, but were unable to play due to the COVID-19 pandemic.

History

Founding and 2020 season
The Frisco Fighters are the third indoor football team to play in Frisco following the Intense Football League's Frisco Thunder (2007–2008) and Champions Indoor Football's Texas Revolution (2018–2019).  The Texas Revolution played in Frisco as a Champions Indoor Football team from 2017 until early 2019, when their membership in that league was terminated.  On November 24, 2019, the IFL announced it would debut a new expansion team in Frisco, owned by automobile dealer Steve Germain and his family.

On December 11, the new Frisco franchise revealed their new team name as the "Frisco Fighters", along with their logo, color scheme, and coaching staff.  The TEAM Management, LLC was retained to manage operating the Fighters. Arena football veteran Clint Dolezel (best known for his time as quarterback of the Grand Rapids Rampage and Dallas Desperados) was announced as the team's inaugural head coach.  In February 2020, the Fighters added former Dallas Cowboys' wide receiver Drew Pearson as chief relationships officer and an analyst for all the Fighters' televised games. 

The IFL completed two games in the 2020 season before the entire season was postponed due to the COVID-19 pandemic, without the Fighters playing a game. The Fighters' inaugural season was eventually cancelled outright. The Fighters continued to advertise on local after their season was cancelled, and engaged in community contributions including volunteer assistance to Meals on Wheels, local schools, and senior health care facilities. According to Dave Whinham of The TEAM Management, these actions helped ensure the team wasn't "easily forgotten" while also drawing on the new team's values.

2021 season

The Fighters played their first game on May 15, 2021, on the road in a 36–33 win over the relaunched Spokane Shock. Near the end of the 2021 season, head coach Dolezel was signed to a multi-year extension after leading to the team to a 10–2 record. The team then finished with a 10–3 record and advanced to the playoffs, making it to the league semifinal, where they lost to the Massachusetts Pirates 43–22.

2022 season
After the 2021 season ended, Dolezel left the team to pursue other opportunities, and was replaced by former Spokane Shock head coach Billy Back. Also during the off-season, the Germain family and the Dallas Stars of the National Hockey League jointly announced a new partnership, which replaced the Fighters' 2020-21 business management team with the Dallas Stars organization for the 2022 season.

The Fighters opened the 2022 season on March 12 on the road against the 2021 IFL champion Massachusetts Pirates, and were initially scheduled to play their first 2022 home game on April 1 against the Bismarck Bucks.  However, due to the collapse of the Spokane Shock franchise in February, the IFL revised its schedule, moving the Fighters' first home game up to March 26 against the Duke City Gladiators. Frisco finished the regular season with a 14-2 record, advancing to the playoffs for the second year in a row.

After winning a playoff quarterfinal game against the Iowa Barnstormers, the Fighters were eliminated in the semifinal round with a 48-41 loss to the Quad City Steamwheelers.

Current roster

References

External links
 Frisco Fighters official site
 IFL official site

2019 establishments in Texas
American football teams in the Dallas–Fort Worth metroplex
Indoor Football League teams
American football teams established in 2019
Sports in Frisco, Texas